The Brokkat language (Dzongkha: བྲོཀ་ཁ་; Wylie: Brok-kha; also called "Brokskad" and "Jokay") is an endangered Southern Tibetic language spoken by about 300 people in the village of Dhur in Bumthang Valley of Bumthang District in central Bhutan. Brokkat is spoken by descendants of pastoral yakherd communities.

See also
Languages of Bhutan

References

External links 
Himalayan Languages Project

Languages of Bhutan
South Bodish languages